Lehtmetsa may refer to several places in Estonia:

Lehtmetsa, Harju County, village in Anija Parish, Harju County
Lehtmetsa, Järva County, village in Albu Parish, Järva County
Lehtmetsa, Pärnu County, village in Halinga Parish, Pärnu County
Lehtmetsa, Saare County, village in Muhu Parish, Saare County

See also
Lehemetsa, village in Lasva Parish, Võru County